Subtercola boreus is a psychrophilic bacterium from the genus Subtercola which has been isolated from groundwater from Finland.

References

Microbacteriaceae
Bacteria described in 2000